Imatomi Dam is a gravity dam located in Yamaguchi prefecture in Japan. The dam is used for flood control. The catchment area of the dam is 8.6 km2. The dam impounds about 18  ha of land when full and can store 1700 thousand cubic meters of water. The construction of the dam was started on 1971 and completed in 1978.

References

Dams in Yamaguchi Prefecture
1978 establishments in Japan